Georg Christoph Lichtenberg (1 July 1742 – 24 February 1799) was a German physicist, satirist, and Anglophile. As a scientist, he was the first to hold a professorship explicitly dedicated to experimental physics in Germany. He is remembered for his posthumously published notebooks, which he himself called sudelbücher, a description modelled on the English bookkeeping term "waste books" or "scrapbooks", and for his discovery of tree-like electrical discharge patterns now called Lichtenberg figures.

Life
Georg Christoph Lichtenberg was born in Ober-Ramstadt near Darmstadt, Landgraviate of Hesse-Darmstadt, the youngest of 17 children. His father, Johann Conrad Lichtenberg, was a pastor ascending through the ranks of the church hierarchy, who eventually became superintendent for Darmstadt. Unusually for a clergyman in those times, he seems to have possessed a fair amount of scientific knowledge. Lichtenberg was educated at his parents' house until 10 years old, when he joined the Lateinschule in Darmstadt. His intelligence became obvious at a very early age. He wanted to study mathematics, but his family could not afford to pay for lessons. In 1762, his mother applied to Ludwig VIII, Landgrave of Hesse-Darmstadt, who granted sufficient funds. In 1763, Lichtenberg entered the University of Göttingen.

In 1769 he became extraordinary professor of physics, and six years later ordinary professor. He held this post till his death. Invited by his students, he visited England twice, from Easter to early Summer 1770 and from August 1774 to Christmas 1775, where he was received cordially by George III and Queen Charlotte. He led the King through the royal observatory in Richmond, upon which the king proposed that he become professor of philosophy. He also met with participants of Cook's voyages. Great Britain impressed him, and he subsequently became a well-known Anglophile.

One of the first scientists to introduce experiments with apparatus in their lectures, Lichtenberg was a popular and respected figure in contemporary European intellectual circles. He was one of the first to introduce Benjamin Franklin's lightning rod to Germany by installing such devices in his house and garden sheds. He maintained relations with most of the great figures of that era, including Goethe and Kant. In 1784, Alessandro Volta visited Göttingen especially to see him and his experiments. Mathematician Karl Friedrich Gauss sat in on his lectures. In 1793, he was elected a member of the Royal Society.

Lichtenberg was prone to procrastination. He failed to launch the first hydrogen balloon. He always dreamed of writing a novel à la Fielding's Tom Jones, but never finished more than a few pages. 

Lichtenberg became a hunchback as a child owing to a malformation of his spine suffered from a fall. This left him unusually short, even by 18th-century standards. Over time, this malformation grew worse, ultimately affecting his breathing.

Personal life
In 1777, he met Maria Stechard, then aged 13, who lived with the professor permanently after 1780. She died in 1782. Their relationship was made into a novel by Gert Hofmann, which was translated by his son Michael Hofmann into English with the title Lichtenberg and the Little Flower Girl.

In 1783, the following year, Lichtenberg met Margarethe Kellner (1768–1848). He married her in 1789, to give her a pension, as he thought he was to die soon. They had six children and she outlived him by 49 years.

In 1799, Lichtenberg died in Göttingen after a short illness at the age of 56.

Scrap books

The "scrapbooks" (Sudelbücher in German) are notebooks, in the tradition of commonplace books or waste books, which  Lichtenberg kept from his student days until the end of his life. Each volume was accorded a letter of the alphabet from A, which began in 1765, to L, which broke off at Lichtenberg's death in 1799.

These notebooks first became known to the world after the man's death, when the first and second editions of Lichtenbergs Vermischte Schriften (1800–06 and 1844–53) were published by his sons and brothers. After the initial publications, however, notebooks G and H, and most of notebook K, were destroyed or disappeared. Those missing parts are believed to have contained sensitive materials. The manuscripts of the remaining notebooks are preserved in Göttingen University.

The notebooks contain quotations of passages that struck Lichtenberg, titles of books to read, autobiographical sketches, and short or long reflections, including keen observations on human nature, in the manner of the 17th-century French moralists. Those reflections helped him earn his posthumous fame as one of the best aphorists in Western intellectual history. Some scholars have attempted to distill a system of thought of Lichtenberg's scattered musings, but he was not a professional philosopher, and had no need to present, or to conceive, a consistent philosophy.

The scrapbooks reveal a critical and analytical way of thinking and emphasis on experimental evidence in physics, through which he became one of the early founders and advocates of modern scientific methodology.
The more experience and experiments are accumulated during the exploration of nature, the more faltering its theories become. It is always good though not to abandon them instantly. For every hypothesis which used to be good at least serves the purpose of duly summarizing and keeping all phenomena until its own time. One should lay down the conflicting experience separately, until it has accumulated sufficiently to justify the efforts necessary to edifice a new theory. (Lichtenberg: scrapbook JII/1602) Lichtenberg, an atheist, satirized religion saying "I thank the Lord a thousand times for having made me become an atheist."

Arthur Schopenhauer admired Lichtenberg greatly for what he had written in his notebooks. He called him one of those who "think ... for their own instruction", who are "genuine 'thinkers for themselves' in both senses of the words". 
Other admirers of Lichtenberg's notebooks include Friedrich Nietzsche, Sigmund Freud, Ludwig Wittgenstein and Jacques Barzun.<ref>Barzun dedicated a chapter to the "Forgotten Troop" of intellectuals who reoriented the world in 1775-1815, among whom Lichtenberg was "the most grievous" omission from modern memory:  From Dawn to Decadence: 500 Years of Western Cultural Life" (Harper Collins, 2000) p. 439. For Lichtenberg's influences on German writers, see Dieter Lamping, Lichtenbergs literarisches Nachleben, Göttingen: Vandenhoeck & Ruprecht, 1992.</ref>

Sigmund Freud (in his "Why War?” letter to Albert Einstein) mentioned Lichtenberg's invention of a "Compass of Motives" in a discussion on the combination of human compounded motives and quoted him as saying, "The motives that lead us to do anything might be arranged like the thirty-two winds and might be given names on the same pattern: for instance, 'food-food-fame' or 'fame-fame-food'.”

Lichtenberg is not read by many outside Germany. Leo Tolstoy held Lichtenberg's writings in high esteem, expressing his perplexity of "why the Germans of the present day neglect this writer so much." 
The Chinese scholar and wit Qian Zhongshu quotes the Scrapbooks in his works several times.

Other works
As a satirist, Lichtenberg takes high rank among the German writers of the 18th century. His biting wit involved him in many controversies with well-known contemporaries, such as the Swiss physiognomist Johann Kaspar Lavater whose science of physiognomy he ridiculed, and Johann Heinrich Voss, whose views on Greek pronunciation called forth a powerful satire, Über die Pronunciation der Schöpse des alten Griechenlandes. For Laurence Sterne's wit on the bigotry of the clergy, in his novel Tristram Shandy, Lichtenberg condemned him as a scandalum ecclesiae (a scandal for the Church).

In 1777, Lichtenberg opposed the apparent misrepresentation of science by Jacob Philadelphia. Lichtenberg considered him to be a magician, not a physicist, and created a satirical poster that was intended to prevent Philadelphia from performing his exhibition in Göttingen. The placard, called “Lichtenberg's Avertissement,” described extravagant and miraculous tricks that were to be performed. As a result, Philadelphia left the city without a performance.

Based on his visits to England, his Briefe aus England, with admirable descriptions of David Garrick's acting, are the most attractive of his writings published during his lifetime.
 
From 1778 onward, Lichtenberg published the Göttinger Taschen Calender and contributed to the Göttingisches Magazin der Wissenschaften und Literatur, which he edited for three years (1780–1782) with J. G. A. Forster. The Göttinger Taschen Calender, beside being a usual Calendar for everyday usage, contained not only short writings on natural phenomena and new scientific discoveries (which would be termed popular science today), but also essays in which he contested quackery and superstition. It also contained attacks on the “Sturm und Drang” writers. In the spirit of the Age of Enlightenment, he strove to educate the common people to use logic, wit and the power of their own senses.

In 1784 he took over the publication of the textbook Anfangsgründe der Naturlehre ("Foundations of the Natural Sciences") from his friend and colleague Johann Christian Erxleben upon his premature death in 1777. Until 1794, three further editions followed, which for many years, remained the standard textbook for physics in German.

From 1794 to 1799 he published an Ausführliche Erklärung der Hogarthischen Kupferstiche, in which he described the satirical details in William Hogarth's prints.

Legacy
As a physicist, Lichtenberg is remembered for his investigations in electricity, for discovering branching discharge patterns on dielectrics, now called Lichtenberg figures. In 1777, he built a large electrophorus to generate static electricity through induction. With it, he discovered the basic principle of modern xerography copy machine technology. By discharging a high voltage point near an insulator, he was able to record strange, tree-like patterns in fixed dust. These Lichtenberg figures are considered today to be examples of fractals.
A crater on the Moon is named Lichtenberg in his honour. His life and works are fictionalized in French novelist Pierre Senges's Fragments de Lichtenberg (2008; English translation, 2017).

He proposed the standardized paper size system used globally today except in Canada and the US defined by ISO 216, which has A4 as the most commonly used size.

Robert Wichard Pohl, a 20th-century successor of Lichtenberg in Göttingen and one of the founders of solid state physics used a similar research programme, in which the experiment was an essential part of narrating scientific knowledge.

Selected bibliography
Works published during his lifetime
 Briefe aus England, 1776–78
 Über Physiognomik, wider die Physiognomen, 1778
 Göttingisches Magazin der Wissenschaften und Litteratur, 1780–85 (ed. by Georg Christoph Lichtenberg and Georg Forster)
 Über die Pronunciation der Schöpse des alten Griechenlandes, 1782
 Ausführliche Erklärung der Hogarthischen Kupferstiche, 1794–1799

Complete works in German
 Schriften und Briefe, 1968–72 (4 vols., ed. by Wolfgang Promies)

English translations
 The Reflections of Lichtenberg, Swan Sonnenschein, 1908 (selected and translated by Norman Alliston).
 Lichtenberg's Visits to England, as Described in his Letters and Diaries, Oxford, The Clarendon Press, 1938 (trans. and ed., by Margaret L. Mare and W. H. Quarrell)
 The Lichtenberg Reader, Beacon Press, 1959 (trans. and ed. by Franz H. Mautner and Henry Hatfield)
 The World of Hogarth. Lichtenberg's Commentaries on Hogarth's Engravings, Houghton Mifflin Company, 1966 (trans. by Innes and Gustav Herdan)
 Hogarth on High Life. The Marriage à la Mode Series, from Georg Christoph Lichtenberg's Commentaries, 1970 (trans. and ed. by Arthur S. Wensinger and W. B. Coley)
 Aphorisms, Penguin, 1990 (trans. with an introduction and notes by R. J. Hollingdale), reprinted as The Waste Books, 2000, 
 Lichtenberg: Aphorisms & Letters, Johnathan Cape, 1969 (trans. and ed. by Franz H. Mautner and Henry Hatfield), SBN 224-61286-7
 G.C. Lichtenberg: Philosophical Writings, (trans. and ed. by Steven Tester), Albany: State University of New York Press, 2012.

Notes

References
 
 
 
 
 Øksenholt, Svein (1963). Thoughts Concerning Education in the Works of Georg Christoph Lichtenberg: An Introductory Study in Comparative Education, Martinus Nijhoff.
 
 

Further reading
 Buechler, Ralph Wolfgang (1988). Science, Satire and Wit: The Essays of Georg Christoph Lichtenberg, University of Wisconsin-Madison.
 Katritzky, Linde (1995). "Coleridge's Links with Leading Men of Science," Notes and Records of the Royal Society of London, Vol. 49, No. 2.
 Mautner, Franz H. and Miller, Jr., Franklin (1952). "Remarks on G. C. Lichtenberg, Humanist-Scientist," Isis, Vol. 43, No. 3.
 Milch, Werner J. (1942). "Georg Christoph Lichtenberg: On the Occasion of the Two Hundredth Anniversary of His Birth, 9 July 1942," The Modern Language Review, Vol. 37, No. 3.
 Sanke, Jean M. (1999). Georg Christoph Lichtenberg: A Critical Bibliography of Research and Criticism, 1948–1996'', Purdue University.
 J. P. Stern (1959). Lichtenberg: A Doctrine of Scattered Occasions; Reconstructed from his Aphorisms and Reflections, Indiana University Press.

External links

 The Lichtenberg Society lichtenberg-gesellschaft.de
 
 
 
 
 Original Lichtenberg texts Projekt Gutenberg, spiegel.de
 Book review: G. C. Lichtenberg: a "spy on humanity" New Criterion, 20 May 2002
 Clive James Georg Christoph Lichtenberg: Lessons on how to write 2 March 2007, Slate.com
 Book review: Aphorisms by Georg Christoph Lichtenberg umich.edu
 Jürgen Teichmann Georg Christoph Lichtenberg : Experimental Physics from the Spirit of Aphorism (PDF) January 2000 pp 229–244, chapter, in: K. von Meyenn: Die großen Physiker, 2 volumes, München, Beck, ppp.unipv.it

1742 births
1799 deaths
18th-century German physicists
Aphorists
Atheist philosophers
German atheists
German satirists
People from the Landgraviate of Hesse-Darmstadt
University of Göttingen alumni
Academic staff of the University of Göttingen
Fellows of the Royal Society
Honorary members of the Saint Petersburg Academy of Sciences
German male non-fiction writers
Enlightenment philosophers
Members of the Göttingen Academy of Sciences and Humanities